Héctor Travieso is an actor, comedian, and television host from Cuba. Travieso immigrated to Puerto Rico and has an extensive career in telenovelas. He hosted SuperXclusivo, and La Comay serving as sidekick to the show's protagonist and puppet, La Comay. After fourteen years Travieso returned to television in "Dando Candela" by Telemundo, but abruptly and in tears announced his departure in March 2019, stating he had to attend to family matters.

References

External links
 

Puerto Rican television personalities
Living people
Year of birth missing (living people)